Paul Anthony Robotham is a Jamaican diplomat who served as Jamaican ambassador to Japan and India and was a permanent secretary in the Ministry of Foreign Affairs and Foreign Trade.

Career 
Robotham was appointed Jamaican ambassador to Japan in 2004. Following his appointment, he stated that his focus in Japan would be to revive Japanese tourists visit to Jamaica which had fallen from 30,000 annual tourists visits in 1996 to only 6,000 visits in 2003. He was redeployed to India as ambassador and presented his letter of credence to Indian President, A P J Abdul Kalam on 13 March 2007.

References 

Jamaican diplomats
Ambassadors of Jamaica to China
Year of birth missing (living people)
Living people